Ray Nicholas Yeoman (8 October 1934 – 4 April 2004) was an Australian rules footballer who played with Hawthorn in the Victorian Football League (VFL).

Notes

External links 

		

1934 births
2004 deaths
Australian rules footballers from Victoria (Australia)		
Hawthorn Football Club players
Mansfield Football Club players